The Keldysh bomber was a Soviet design for a rocket-powered sub-orbital bomber spaceplane, which drew heavily upon work carried out by Eugen Sänger and Irene Bredt for the German Silbervogel project.

Development 
During the closing weeks of World War II, the German work at Peenemünde was investigated by Soviet intelligence, amongst whom was rocket motor constructor Alexey Isayev, who found a copy of Sänger and Bredt's report. A translation was soon circulating among Soviet rocket designers, and a condensed version made its way to Stalin himself.

In November 1946 the NII-1 NKAP research institute was formed with mathematician Mstislav Vsevolodovich Keldysh as its head to investigate and develop the German Sänger–Bredt design. In 1947, studies indicated that the high fuel consumption of Sänger's rocket-based design rendered the concept impracticable in the short term. Using engines considered to be available in a reasonable timespan, 95% of the vehicle's initial mass would have to be propellant. However, use of ramjets during the acceleration phase would give the craft a more reasonable 22% dead weight and still achieve the 5 km/s velocity required for a  intercontinental range.

It was estimated that it would take until the mid-1950s before a draft project of a feasible design could be prepared, and by that time the design had been made obsolete by more advanced designs. However, the work carried out would lead to the EKR, MKR, Buran, and Burya ramjet cruise missiles.

Proposed mission profile
 The 100-tonne craft would be accelerated to 500 m/s using a sled running along a 3 km track and powered by five or six RKDS-100 rocket engines of 600 tonnes total thrust. Separation velocity would be reached 11 seconds after ignition.
 After separation from the sled, the craft would climb using its main RKDS-100 rocket engine and two wingtip-mounted ramjets, which would accelerate it to an altitude of 20 km and a speed of over Mach 3.
 The rocket would continue working after the ramjets had flamed out at high altitude; it had a specific impulse of 285 seconds, a thrust of 100 tonnes, and used liquid oxygen/kerosene propellants.

Specifications

General characteristics
Function: Sub-orbital bomber
Launch mass: 
Total length: 28 m
Launch platform: Rocket sled
Status: Canceled

Launch sled (stage 0)
Engine: 5/6 × RKDS-100 rocket engines
Length: 14 m (45 ft)
Diameter: 3.6 m (11.8 ft)
Thrust: 
Oxidizer: LOx
Combustible: Kerosene

Keldysh bomber (stage 1)
Engine: 1 × RKDS-100 rocket, 2 × ramjets
Speed : Mach 3
Range: 
Flight altitude: 
Warhead: 
Length: 28.0 m
Diameter: 3.6 m
Wing span: 15 m
Wing area: 126 m²

See also
 Silbervogel
 Spacecraft propulsion
 X-20 Dynasoar

References

External links
 Astronautix.com

Spaceplanes
Space weapons
Rocket-powered aircraft
Ramjet-powered aircraft
1940s Soviet bomber aircraft
Germany–Soviet Union relations